Rosa Estaràs Ferragut (born 21 October 1965) is a Spanish politician and current Member of the European Parliament (MEP). She is a member of the People's Party.

Member of the European Parliament, 2009–present
In the 2009 European elections, Estaràs was elected as Member of the European Parliament. She currently serves as vice-chairwoman of the Committee on Petitions and as full member of the Committee on Legal Affairs. She is also a member of the parliament's delegation to the ACP–EU Joint Parliamentary Assembly.

In addition to her committee assignments, Estaràs is a member of the European Parliament Intergroup on Artificial Intelligence and Digital, the European Parliament Intergroup on Seas, Rivers, Islands and Coastal Areas; the European Parliament Intergroup on LGBT Rights; the European Parliament Intergroup on Disability and the MEP Alliance for Mental Health.

References

1965 births
Living people
MEPs for Spain 2009–2014
MEPs for Spain 2014–2019
People from Valldemosa
People's Party (Spain) MEPs
MEPs for Spain 2019–2024